Women in Film & Video Women of Vision Award is an annual award by the Women in Film and Television International District of Columbia.

Recipients 
2020 Melissa Houghton
2017 Julie Dash
2016 Christine Vachon
2015 Joan Darling, Dawn Porter
2013 Penny Marshall
2012 Shirin Ghareeb, Agnieszka Holland, Margaret Parsons, Christine Weber
2011 Maryanne Culpepper, Cecilia Domeyko, Mickey Green, Laura Possessky
2010 Patricia Aufderheide, Grace Guggenheim, Connie Day-McClinton
2009 Constance Chatfield-Taylor, Sharon Sloane, Sheila Smith
2008 Patty Duke, Heidi Ewing and Rachel Grady, Susan Lacy, Linda Maslow
2007 Susie Coelho, Patricia Finneran, Barbara Kopple, Deborah Redmond, Andrea Sims, 
2006 Diana Ingraham, Beth Mendelson, Laureen Ong, Nina Gilden Seavey, Daphne Maxwell Reid
2005 Stephanie Antosca, Jennifer Cortner, Carrie Fisher, Carol Flaisher, Brooke Bailey Johnson, 
2004 Lynda Carter, Phylis Geller, Jennifer Lawson, Penny Lee, Louise Slaughter
2003 Ruby Dee, Amy DeLouise, Ricki Green, Sharon Percy Rockefeller, Carole Simpson
2002 Debra L. Lee, Rosemary Reed, Catherine Wyler
2001 Jean Picker-Firstenberg, Aviva Kempner, Sharon Stone, Aida Takla-O'Reilly
2000 Tipper Gore, Gwen Ifill, Wendie Malick, Judith McHale, Roseanne, Bonnie Nelson Schwartz
1999 Sheila Brooks, Tyne Daly, J.C. Hayward, Tippi Hedren, Linda Ross
1998 Sandy Cannon-Brown, Linda Ellerbee, Robin Smith, Susan Smith, Mary Steenburgen
1997 Ruth Pollak, Renee Poussaint, Cicely Tyson, Marilyn Weiner, Nancy Woodhull
1996 Maureen Bunyan, Michal Carr, Lee Grant, Sherry Jones
1995 Kathy Bates, Elizabeth Campbell, Judith Dwan Hallet, Ruth Roland, Lesley Stahl
1994 Ginny Durrin, Elise Reeder, Nina Rosenblum

See also

 List of American television awards
 List of media awards honoring women

References

External links

http://www.thefreelibrary.com/Women+in+Film+%26+Video+Honors+Industry+Leaders+With+Women+of+Vision...-a0147009600

Women's film organizations
Mass media awards honoring women
Film acting awards
American television awards